SVS may refer to:

Technology
 OS/VS2 (SVS), a precursor of MVS
 Advanced Space Vision System, a computer vision system for the ISS
 Software Virtualization Solution, by Symantec
 Synthetic vision system for aircraft
 Supply Voltage Supervisor, an electronic protective device
 Surround-View System, a synonym of omniview technology in assisted driving systems.

Organizations and companies
 Society for Vascular Surgery
 Sudbury Valley School
 State Veterinary Service, UK
 Saint Vladimir's Orthodox Theological Seminary, Crestwood, NY, US
 Svenska Vitterhetssamfundet, Swedish publisher

Transport
 Seven Sisters station, London, England, National Rail station code
 Stevens Village Airport, IATA code

Other uses
 Standard VIE Settings, of SubSpace video game
 Specific Area Message Encoding, US emergency weather event code
 S. V. Sahasranamam, Indian actor
 Schwartz Value Survey, a personality test